Kim-Jong-hyun is a South Korean former player and current caretaker of Daejeon Citizen.

External links
 K League-Kim Jong-hyun

1973 births
Living people
Association football defenders
South Korean footballers
Daejeon Hana Citizen FC players
K League 1 players
Daejeon Hana Citizen FC managers
K League 2 managers
Jeonnam Dragons players
South Korean football managers
Chungbuk National University alumni